The Shamrock Bowl is the championship game of the American Football Ireland (AFI), the highest level of American football on the island of Ireland, culminating a season that begins in March of the current calendar season.

The Shamrock Bowl uses Roman numerals to identify each game, rather than the year in which it was held. For example, Shamrock Bowl XIII was played on 30 August 1998, following the regular season played in 1998, while Shamrock Bowl XXV was played on 31 July 2011, to determine the champion of the 2011 regular season.

The reigning champions are UCD American Football, who beat Dublin Rebels 52-24 at Kingspan Stadium in Belfast to win Shamrock Bowl XXXIV.

Results

Shamrock Bowl appearances by team

Shamrock Bowl MVP

References

External links
 AFI official website

References 

 
Irish American Football League
Recurring sporting events established in 1986
1986 establishments in Ireland
American football bowls in Europe